The coat of arms of the Government of Northern Ireland was granted to the Executive Committee of the Privy Council of Northern Ireland in 1924.

History
The coat of arms was designed by Major Sir Nevile Wilkinson, Ulster King of Arms, at Dublin Castle, in 1923. In January 1924, Major Wilkinson held discussions with Northern Irish officials in London regarding the coat of arms. The final design was completed by Wilkinson's deputy, Thomas Ulick Sadleir, for approval by the Northern Irish cabinet in April 1924. The artwork was approved and the Royal Warrant signed by King George V and issued through the Home Office on 2 August 1924 and registered in the Register of Arms in Dublin as follows:

Royal Warrant Government of Northern Ireland
Argent a cross gules, overall on a six pointed star of the field ensigned by an Imperial crown proper a dexter hand couped at the wrist of the second.
Given at our Court of St. James in the 15th year of our reign 2nd August 1924 by His Majesty's command.

The supporters were granted in 1925: a red lion rampant, as on the Royal Banner of Scotland, to represent the Ulster Scots, and an Irish elk to represent the "native element". The lion bears a flag with the Irish harp and the Irish elk bears a flag with the arms of the De Burgh family (described above). The supporters were blazoned as follows:

Dexter a lion gules armed langued and collared or, supporting a flagstaff proper, therefrom flowing to the sinister a banner azure, charged with a harp or, stringed argent, surmounted by an imperial crown proper; Sinister an Irish elk proper, collared or, supporting a like staff, therefrom flowing to the dexter a banner or charged with a cross gules.

In 1971, the College of Arms in London added the compartment on which the supporters stand:

On a grassy mount two flax plants each with three flowers on stems proper.

Present status
The grant has not been rescinded, but the arms are considered historical, as the body to which the arms were granted no longer exists, and so they cannot be used unless regranted to another armiger. The current Northern Ireland Executive does not use a coat of arms.

The former flag of the Government of Northern Ireland is derived from the arms. The flag is the arms alone (the shield), for supporters are never displayed on a flag. Supporters are not part of the arms – they support the arms, which are on the shield. The formerly official flag continues to be used to represent Northern Ireland at some sports events. Use today can be controversial in some parts of Northern Ireland.

Symbols currently used in Northern Ireland for official purposes

The Northern Ireland Office uses the Royal coat of arms of the United Kingdom which also appear on the cover of Acts of the Northern Ireland Assembly. The Northern Ireland Assembly adopted an official emblem in 1998 which depicts six blue flax flowers. The six flowers represent the six historic counties that make up Northern Ireland and the region's history of linen making. The colour is similar to the seats in the assembly chamber at Parliament Buildings, Stormont. This emblem is based on a design created by Leslie Durbin that featured six flax flowers and a coronet which was used to represent Northern Ireland on £1 coins minted in 1991. The Northern Ireland Executive uses a logo depicting representation of the Giant's Causeway.

The Celtic harp represents Northern Ireland indirectly as Ireland in the Royal coat of arms of the United Kingdom.

See also

Coat of arms of Ulster
Flag of Northern Ireland
Coat of arms of Ireland

References

Northern Ireland
Northern Ireland
National symbols of Northern Ireland
Coats of arms of Northern Ireland
Northern Ireland
Northern Ireland
Northern Ireland
Northern Ireland
Northern Ireland
Northern Ireland
Northern Ireland
Northern Ireland